Shannon Faulkner is an American teacher, best known for being the first female student to attend The Citadel in 1994, following a lawsuit. She currently teaches English in Greenville, South Carolina.

Biography 
Faulkner was born in Powdersville, South Carolina, United States, and graduated from Wren High School in January 1993. Faulkner was angry that The Citadel would not allow women. Faulkner became the first woman to attempt to enter the Corps of Cadets at The Citadel, which previously had a male-only admissions policy. Her application to the school was accompanied with having her gender blanked out of her high school transcripts. Faulkner enrolled after a successful lawsuit, Faulkner v. Jones et al., against the military academy. The suit alleged that the Citadel, which received state money, was "denying her equal protection under the Constitution". Her lawyer, Val Vojdik, said, "We are seeking educational opportunity... We are seeking equal access to a public program we pay for."

The Citadel allowed Faulkner to attend classes in January 1994 as a civilian student, which meant she had to be off campus by the time retreat was played. She was not allowed to reside in the barracks nor wear the cadet's uniform.

Faulkner matriculated into The Citadel with an otherwise all-male corps of cadets on August 15, 1995 under the escort of United States Marshals. The following day, which was the first day of "Hell Week", the area was hit by 100-degree weather. A black flag was hoisted, which warned of the heat and signaled that cadets were to drink water frequently. At lunch, the cadets were forced to eat large quantities of a noodle casserole, and Shannon began feeling sick. Faulkner reported that she felt nauseous to Ray Gerber, her cadreman, and shortly after vomited in the mess-tent bathroom. Faulkner and four male cadets, who were also suffering from heat-stress, were taken to the infirmary. She rejoined the corps two hours later, but despite exercises being moved into an air-conditioned building she continued to be nauseous. She then returned to the infirmary, where she spent the remainder of that week before washing out, citing emotional and psychological abuse and physical exhaustion. Faulkner was one of thirty cadets to drop out. After her departure, the male cadets openly celebrated on the campus. She told Oprah Winfrey on her show that she had gained weight during the court trials due to the stress she was facing.

Two decades later, in a 2012 interview with the Post and Courier newspaper, Faulkner said that what precipitated her leaving so abruptly was a threat to kill her parents by a person present when she entered. Her parents' home was vandalized. In 1999, she told the Associated Press, "I went into it knowing I may not get anything out of it. I was doing it for the next woman."

Writer Pat Conroy paid for Faulkner's education after she left the Citadel, and she became a middle school teacher in South Carolina. Faulkner attended Furman University and later Anderson College, where she graduated in 1999 with a degree in secondary education. After graduating she was hired by Carolina High School.

In popular culture

Lisa Simpson's experience in The Simpsons''' 8th-season finale, "The Secret War of Lisa Simpson" (1997), broadly resembles Faulkner's.

References
Notes

BibliographyIn the Company of Men: A Woman at The Citadel (Simon Pulse:Reprint edition 2002) by Nancy Mace, the first woman to graduate from The Citadel.In Glory's Shadow : The Citadel, Shannon Faulkner, and a Changing America (Vintage:2001)'' by Catherine S. Manegold.

External links
"Women Gain Ground at Citadel", Fox News
1995 Interview on NPR

1976 births
Living people
People from Anderson County, South Carolina
Anderson University (South Carolina) alumni
Southern Wesleyan University alumni
American women educators
21st-century American women